Parker Pond is a pond located in the towns of Fayette, Mount Vernon, Chesterville, and Vienna, Maine. Boat access is gained via an undeveloped launch at the north end. Bearnstow, a weekly summer camp, is located on its eastern shore.

References

External links
Survey and Map from State of Maine
Winthrop Lakes Region Chamber of Commerce

Lakes of Kennebec County, Maine
Lakes of Maine